A symbol group is a form of franchise of convenience shops, found primarily in the United Kingdom and Ireland. They do not own or operate shops, but act as suppliers to independent shops which then trade under a common banner. 

Unlike other forms of franchise, they have expanded primarily by selling their services to existing shops, rather than by actively developing new outlets. Examples of such franchises are Spar, Londis, Nisa Local and Centra.

Groups
Symbol groups include:
Spar
Londis - 1,800 shops (part of Booker Group)
Costcutter - 2,600 shops
 Musgrave Group
 BWG Foods
Premier Stores - 3,400 shops (part of Booker Group)
Nisa - 2,400 shops

Booker Group is a wholly owned subsidiary of Tesco.

Market
In 2014, the Institute of Grocery Distribution (IGD) reported that the symbol group market is worth £15.5bn, with a 42% share of the UK convenience market through 17,080 shops.

In the 2010s there was significant consolidation in the sector, as Tesco purchased Booker and the Co-operative Group purchased Nisa.

See also
Co-op Food which has a similar corporate structure, although is not usually considered a symbol group.
Edeka, a German grocery chain which has a structure similar to a symbol group

References

Convenience stores
Business models
Franchises
Purchasing consortia
Convection